The France national amateur football team was the amateur representative team for France in football. It was active from 1932 to 1989.

History 
The team was created following the introduction of professional-level football in France in 1932. Although it is not the same team as the France Olympic football team, the amateurs participated in the qualification phases for the Olympic Games in 1960 and 1980.

On 15 May 1963, the team played in a match against the England amateur team for the occasion of the centenary of The Football Association.

During the 1967 Mediterranean Games, the final between France and Italy finished in a 0–0 draw. The referees decided to determine a winner via a coin toss, which Italy won. However, the organizational committee overturned this decision and declared both countries as winners. In their next five Mediterranean Games appearances, France finished runners-up three times in 1975, 1979, and 1987.

The team's last ever match was a 3–2 loss against Congo in Mohammedia, Morocco on 22 July 1989.

Mediterranean Games record

See also 

 France national football team
 France national football B team

References

External links 

 Mediterranean Games Overview on RSSSF.com

France national football team
European national amateur association football teams
Former national association football teams in Europe
Association football clubs established in 1932
1932 establishments in France
Association football clubs disestablished in 1989
1989 disestablishments in France